Nowhere Man is the 12th extended play (EP) by the English rock band the Beatles. It was released on 8 July 1966. It includes four songs from their album Rubber Soul, which had been released in December 1965. The EP was only issued in mono, with the Parlophone catalogue number GEP 8952.

On the day of the EP's release, the Beatles arrived back in London after the end of their 1966 tour of West Germany and the Far East, and having decided to quit touring at the end of the year. Referring to the hostility they had just received in the Philippines, from militia and citizens loyal to the Marcos regime, and the outrage in the United States over John Lennon's remark that the Beatles had become "more popular than Jesus", George Harrison told reporters at Heathrow Airport: "We're going to have a couple of weeks to recuperate before we go and get beaten up by the Americans."

In the UK, Nowhere Man peaked at number 4 on the national EP chart compiled by Record Retailer. In the United States, the title track and "Drive My Car" had been omitted from Capitol Records' version of Rubber Soul and were instead included on the US and Canada album Yesterday and Today. "Nowhere Man" was also issued as a single in the US in February 1966. Another track from the EP, "Michelle", similarly became a hit in some European countries and in New Zealand.

Reviewing Nowhere Man in their book The Beatles: An Illustrated Record, music critics Roy Carr and Tony Tyler wrote: "The issue of this EP reflects a cute tactic of the mid-'sixties record companies: find out which were the most popular tracks from the artists' last LP – and presto! Another Extended-Player. An accountants' move." In his review for AllMusic, Bruce Eder says:
It only got better than this if one bought the album ... The packaging and art were still cool, but the group's songs and albums were now so substantial (and the latter also selling so well) that the EP was reduced to irrelevancy. Additionally, the Beatles were soon going to start releasing records that were a lot harder to pair together and were also going to take a lot more control over how their work was packaged and delivered.

Track listing
All songs written by Lennon–McCartney.

Side one
"Nowhere Man" – 2:44
"Drive My Car" – 2:25

Side two
"Michelle" – 2:40
"You Won't See Me" – 3:22

References

1966 EPs
The Beatles EPs
Parlophone EPs
Albums produced by George Martin